Severin Mihm (born 12 April 1991) is a German retired footballer who played as a left-back .

External links
 

1991 births
Living people
FC Energie Cottbus II players
SV Babelsberg 03 players
German footballers
3. Liga players
Regionalliga players
Association football fullbacks
FC Viktoria 1889 Berlin players